River Park is a census-designated place (CDP) in St. Lucie County, Florida, United States. The population was 5,222 at the 2010 census, at which time it was listed as Port St. Lucie-River Park. It is part of the Port St. Lucie Metropolitan Statistical Area.

Geography
River Park is located at  (27.322588, -80.334101).

According to the United States Census Bureau, the CDP has a total area of 2.5 square miles (6.5 km), of which 2.3 square miles (6.1 km) is land and 0.2 square mile (0.5 km) (7.17%) is water.

Demographics

As of the census of 2010, there were 5,222 people, 2,383 households, and 1,467 families residing in the CDP. The racial makeup of the CDP was 91.07% White, 4.77% African American, 0.19% Native American, 1.10% Asian, 0.02% Pacific Islander, 1.72% from other races, and 1.12% from two or more races. Hispanic or Latino of any race were 6.42% of the population.

There were 2,383 households, out of which 17.0% had children under the age of 18 living with them, 48.9% were married couples living together, 8.8% had a female householder with no husband present, and 38.4% were non-families. 31.4% of all households were made up of individuals, and 21.0% had someone living alone who was 65 years of age or older.  The average household size was 2.16 and the average family size was 2.66.

In the CDP, the population was spread out, with 16.6% under the age of 18, 5.0% from 18 to 24, 22.2% from 25 to 44, 22.2% from 45 to 64, and 34.0% who were 65 years of age or older.  The median age was 51 years. For every 100 females, there were 92.2 males.  For every 100 females age 18 and over, there were 87.2 males.

The median income for a household in the CDP was $30,284, and the median income for a family was $36,932. Males had a median income of $28,409 versus $21,038 for females. The per capita income for the CDP was $22,217.  About 4.4% of families and 9.2% of the population were below the poverty line, including 11.1% of those under age 18 and 7.0% of those age 65 or over.

References

Census-designated places in St. Lucie County, Florida
Port St. Lucie metropolitan area
Census-designated places in Florida